Kiskunlacháza is a city in Pest county in the northern part of Central Hungary, approximately 4 miles from the Danube river and its largest neighbor, Ráckeve. It is divided between the larger Lacháza, a predominantly Protestant and wealthy village, and Pereg, a mostly Catholic and rural village; these two villages comprise its land and population.

Populated places in Pest County